Desmon Kenyatta Farmer (born October 7, 1981) is an American former professional basketball player. He played briefly in the National Basketball Association (NBA), for the Seattle SuperSonics and the San Antonio Spurs.

College career
Farmer attended and played collegiately for the University of Southern California (USC); he averaged 19 points per game and nearly five rebounds in his final two years combined, graduating in 2004.

Professional career
After being signed and eventually cut before the season started by the NBA's Indiana Pacers in 2004, Farmer played professionally in Greece, Belgium and Poland before returning to the U.S. to play for the NBA Development League's Tulsa 66ers in 2005–06, averaging 16.4 points per game. Farmer was signed to a contract by the Seattle SuperSonics in October 2006, being waived on January 4, 2007, appearing in eight games during the season.

After two seasons, with the 66ers and Rio Grande Valley Vipers—also from the D-League—and a couple of months in Puerto Rico, with Atléticos de San Germán, Farmer was signed by the San Antonio Spurs on September 18, 2008. After playing sparingly, he was waived on November 16, in order to make roster space available for another guard, Blake Ahearn; he signed with the Reno Bighorns in November 2009, after a brief passage in Croatia with KK Zadar.

On October 1, 2010, Farmer signed with Ironi Ashkelon.

On January 31, 2013, he rejoined the Reno Bighorns.

On January 2, 2015 he signed with Sigal Prishtina of Kosovo.

References

External links
NBA D-League Profile
Basketpedya career data

1981 births
Living people
African-American basketball players
American expatriate basketball people in Argentina
American expatriate basketball people in Belgium
American expatriate basketball people in Croatia
American expatriate basketball people in Greece
American expatriate basketball people in Israel
American expatriate basketball people in Poland
American expatriate basketball people in Russia
American expatriate basketball people in the Dominican Republic
American men's basketball players
Aris B.C. players
Atléticos de San Germán players
Basketball players from Flint, Michigan
BC Oostende players
BC Spartak Primorye players
Big3 players
Guaiqueríes de Margarita players
Ironi Ashkelon players
KK Zadar players
Asseco Gdynia players
Reno Bighorns players
Rio Grande Valley Vipers players
San Antonio Spurs players
Seattle SuperSonics players
Shooting guards
Tulsa 66ers players
Undrafted National Basketball Association players
USC Trojans men's basketball players
21st-century African-American sportspeople
20th-century African-American people
American men's 3x3 basketball players